Pyrgus xanthus, the mountain checkered skipper, is a species of spread-wing skipper in the butterfly family Hesperiidae.

The MONA or Hodges number for Pyrgus xanthus is 3964.

References

Further reading

 

Pyrgus
Articles created by Qbugbot